Denelle Celeste Pedrick (born February 26, 1999) is a Canadian artistic gymnast. She represented Canada at the 2022 World Artistic Gymnastics Championships, contributing to the team's historic bronze medal finish. A collegiate gymnast at Central Michigan University from 2017 to 2020, she is a two-time Summer Universiade participant (2017, 2019) and won a silver medal in the team competition at the 2017 edition.

Eponymous skill

References 

1999 births
Living people
Canadian female artistic gymnasts
Sportspeople from Manitoba
Sportspeople from Saskatchewan
Central Michigan University alumni
Medalists at the World Artistic Gymnastics Championships
Universiade medalists in gymnastics
21st-century Canadian women
Universiade silver medalists for Canada
Medalists at the 2017 Summer Universiade